The 60th Corps was a corps formation of the German Army in World War I.  It was formed on 20 November 1916 by the establishment of Gruppe Mitau and was still in existence at the end of the war.

Chronicle 
Gruppe Mitau, named for the city of Mitau, was set up on 3 August 1915.  It was established as 60th Corps (z.b.V.) on 20 November 1916.  It was still in existence at the end of the war.

With the onset of trench warfare, the German Army recognised that it was no longer possible to maintain the traditional Corps unit, that is, one made up of two divisions.  Whereas at some times (and in some places) a Corps of two divisions was sufficient, at other times 5 or 6 divisions were necessary.  Therefore, under the Hindenburg regime (from summer 1916), new Corps headquarters were created without organic divisions.  These new Corps were designated
General Commands for Special Use.

Commanders 
The 60th Corps had the following commanders during its existence:

See also 

German Army (German Empire)

References

Bibliography 
 

Corps of Germany in World War I
Military units and formations established in 1915
Military units and formations disestablished in 1919